"March Forward, Dear Mother Ethiopia", also known by its incipit as "Honour of Citizenship", is the national anthem of Ethiopia.

History
The lyrics were written by Dereje Melaku Mengesha, and the music was composed by Solomon Lulu Mitiku. The song was adopted in 1992, as part of reforms that followed the collapse of the People's Democratic Republic of Ethiopia.

Lyrics

See also
 "Ethiopia, Ethiopia, Ethiopia be first", the national anthem from 1975 to 1992

Notes

References

External links
 Ethiopia: Wodefit Gesgeshi, Widd Innat Ityopp'ya - Audio of the national anthem of Ethiopia, with information and lyrics (archive link)

African anthems
Ethiopian songs
National symbols of Ethiopia
1992 songs
National anthem compositions in C major